Full Blown may refer to:

 Full Blown (Lil Italy album), 2001
 Full Blown (Phantom Blue album), 2000